Óbudai cemetery is a cemetery in Óbuda-Békásmegyer, the 3rd district of Budapest. It lies at the foot of Arany-hegy and Testvér-hegy.  It was opened in 1910 and in 1922 the Óbuda Jewish Cemetery was added. The cemetery does not have a long history, but many famous people are buried there.

Notable interments
 Flórián Albert
 Árpád Göncz

External links

 Óbudai Cemetery at Find a Grave

Óbuda-Békásmegyer
Cemeteries in Hungary